Gerard Maley (born 1970) is an Australian politician who serves as MP for the Country Liberal Party in the Northern Territory Legislative Assembly and Deputy Leader of the Opposition.

Pre-politics

Early life 
Maley's parents moved to the Territory from Sydney. His father was a policeman, and the family lived in Darwin where Maley was born, then settled in Howard Springs when he was 4 years old.

As a young boy he lived through the Cyclone Tracy, with the roof being blown off their house. Maley sheltered in the family car with his mother and brother.

Professional life 
Maley studied to be a mechanic after leaving high school in year 11, and then became an inspector and public relations agent for the Department of Transport & Works.

Following this he returned to study law at Charles Darwin University, and after graduating join his brother, Peter, at Maleys Barristers & Solicitors. He manages the rural office in Coolalinga.

He currently lives on the same family block in Howard Springs that he grew up on.

Politics 

|}
Maley was selected for the Country Liberals to contest the seat Nelson in the 2016 Northern Territory general election which he lost to long time independent member Gerry Wood. He recontested the seat in the 2020 election following Wood's retirement, and won the seat. He tallied 50.6 percent of the primary vote, enough to win the seat without the need for preferences. Ultimately, he won 59.2 percent of the two-candidate vote. However, for most of its existence, Nelson has been a comfortably safe CLP seat in "traditional" two-party matchups against Labor, so Maley's win was not considered an upset. Indeed, he now sits on a "traditional" two-party majority of 23.3 percent after picking up a healthy swing of 16.3 percent against Labor.

The election of 2020 saw only one member of the CLP returning to parliament, leader Lia Finocchiaro. As such there was a need to promote new parliamentarians into leadership roles. Maley was elected as Deputy Leader of the CLP, and hence Deputy Leader of the Opposition. He was also given the portfolios of Shadow Minister for Infrastructure, Multicultural Affairs, Defence Industries, Recreational Fishing, and National Resilience.

References 

1970 births
Living people
Members of the Northern Territory Legislative Assembly
Country Liberal Party members of the Northern Territory Legislative Assembly
Charles Darwin University alumni
People from Darwin, Northern Territory
21st-century Australian politicians